Ronald Ouellet (born 28 November 1946) is a Canadian former wrestler who competed in the 1972 Summer Olympics. He wrestled in college for Michigan State University.

References

External links
 

1946 births
Living people
Olympic wrestlers of Canada
Wrestlers at the 1972 Summer Olympics
Canadian male sport wrestlers